Linnea Axelsson (born 10 December 1980) is a Sami-Swedish art scholar, novelist and poet.

Axelsson was born in Porjus (Bårjås in Lule Sami) in Jokkmokk Municipality. She made her literary debut in 2010 with the novel Tvillingsmycket. Her epic poem Ædnan from 2018 earned her the Svenska Dagbladet Literature Prize, as well as the August Prize for best fiction in 2018.

References

External links

1980 births
Living people
People from Jokkmokk Municipality
Swedish scholars and academics
Umeå University alumni
Swedish novelists
Swedish poets